The siege of Bergen op Zoom may refer to:

 Siege of Bergen op Zoom (1588)
 Siege of Bergen op Zoom (1622)
 Siege of Bergen op Zoom (1747), during the War of the Austrian Succession
 Siege of Bergen op Zoom (1814), during the Napoleonic Wars